WMTN may refer to:

 WMTN (AM), a radio station (1300 AM) licensed to Morristown, Tennessee, United States
 WMTN-LP, a low-power radio station (94.1 FM) licensed to Sewanee, Tennessee, United States